The Macmillan Way is a long-distance footpath in England that links Boston, Lincolnshire to Abbotsbury in Dorset. It is promoted to raise money for the charity Macmillan Cancer Relief. 
 
The fully waymarked route follows existing footpaths, bridleways and byways, and small stretches of minor roads when these are unavoidable. It runs across open fen country for its first  and for the rest of its journey it then follows the course of the oolitic limestone belt.

The Macmillan Way starts from Boston and then runs across the Fens to their western edge at Kate's Bridge near Bourne before joining the limestone belt. From Boston it heads to Stamford and then along the shore of Rutland Water to Oakham. It then leads south and west via Warmington to Stow-on-the-Wold, then  through the Cotswolds via Cirencester and Tetbury to Bradford-on-Avon. Then through Somerset and into Dorset via Castle Cary and Sherborne to Abbotsbury on the coast.

The route links with the Viking Way at Oakham, the Thames Path National Trail near Thames Head and with the South West Coast Path at the finish.

The Macmillan Ways are a network of long-distance footpaths in England. Others are: 
The Macmillan Way West from Castle Cary in Somerset to Barnstaple in Devon,  (Boston to Barnstaple is );
The Macmillan Cross Cotswold Pathway from Banbury to Bath, mostly on the main Macmillan Way;
The Cotswold Link,  from Banbury to Chipping Campden where it links to the Cotswold Way National Trail.

References

External links 

Long-distance footpaths in England
Footpaths (long distance)
Footpaths in Dorset
Footpaths in Lincolnshire
Footpaths in Oxfordshire
Footpaths in Somerset
Footpaths in Gloucestershire